Bunza is a Local Government Area (LGA) in Kebbi State, Nigeria. Its headquarters are in the town of Bunza and was created in 1975 out of the then-state of Sokoto during the local government reform under the general Murtala administration. Bunza shares bounders in the east with Kalgo LGA, the latter was created in 1996 out of the present Bunza; in the north with Dandi and Arewa LGA's; and in the south and west with Suru LGA, the latter was created in 1991 out of Bunza. The major activities of the Bunza are mostly dry wet season farming. Bunza is further divided into four (4) districts Bunza, Raha, Zogirma and Tilli. The LGA is led by is Alh Dr M.M. Bunza

It has an area of 876 km and a 2006 population of 121,461.

The postal code of the area is 862.

References

Local Government Areas in Kebbi State